Per Blom (5 May 1946 – 13 February 2013) was a Norwegian film director.

He was born in Søndre Land.

Among his films are Anton from 1973, and Mors hus from 1974, based on a novel by Knut Faldbakken. Further Kvinner from 1979, Sølvmunn from 1981, and The Ice Palace from 1987, based upon a novel by Tarjei Vesaas.

External links

References

1946 births
2013 deaths
People from Søndre Land
Norwegian film directors